Jessica Unruh is a former member of the North Dakota Senate, representing the 33rd district.

Early life
Unruh was born and raised on a ranch North of Dodge, North Dakota. She graduated from Golden Valley High School in Golden Valley. She currently resides in Beulah, North Dakota, and works as an environmental specialist at Coteau Properties Company Freedom Mine.

Political career
Unruh was first appointed to the Senate in 2012 to succeed Randy Christmann, who resigned from office before the 2013 session. She ran for a full term in 2014 and was re-elected. In 2016, she was selected to be a delegate to the Republican National Convention in Cleveland, Ohio.

References

External links
Official legislative website

People from Mercer County, North Dakota
North Dakota State University alumni
Republican Party North Dakota state senators
Women state legislators in North Dakota
Living people
21st-century American politicians
21st-century American women politicians
Year of birth missing (living people)